Pike Lake may refer to:

Canada
Pike Lake (Ontario), a lake in Lanark County
Pike Lake (Saskatchewan), a lake in Saskatchewan
Pike Lake Provincial Park, a park in Saskatchewan that includes about half of Pike Lake

United States
Pike Lake (Pope County, Minnesota), a lake
Pike Lake, a lake in Scott County, Minnesota
Pike Lake State Park (Ohio)
Pike Lake, Marathon County, Wisconsin, a community
Pike Lake, Washington County, Wisconsin, a community
Pike Lake Unit, Kettle Moraine State Forest, a lake and unit of the Wisconsin state park system